The Tang Cai Zi Zhuan is a Chinese collection of biographies of poets of the Tang Dynasty.

Compiler and date 
It was compiled by the Yuan dynasty figure .

Contents 
It is in ten volumes, and contains biographies of 278 poets.

Textual tradition 
The work was lost in China from the mid-Ming dynasty. It was, however, copied in Japan at the Five Mountains, and that text was later reexported back to China at the end of the Qing dynasty.

References

Works cited

External links 
 Full text at the Chinese Text Project

Yuan dynasty literature